was a Japanese diplomat and politician. He was born in Osaka, graduated from the Tokyo Higher Commercial School (東京高等商業学校, Tōkyō Kōtō Shōgyō Gakkō, now Hitotsubashi University) in 1904, attended the consul course of the same institute, and finished studying there in 1905.

Biography 
He was born on October 30, 1882, in Osaka.

He was an active politician and diplomat.  In 1905, he passed the Foreign Service exam and started to work at the Ministry of Foreign Affairs.  After serving as Mukden Consul General and executive secretary of the London Naval Treaty, he served as Imperial Japan's Ambassador to Belgium in 1930 and to France in 1933.  He became Minister of Foreign Affairs (Senjūrō Hayashi Cabinet) in March 1937, and resigned in June 1937, then was assigned as Diplomatic Adviser, Ministry of Foreign Affairs, under 1st Fumimaro Konoye Cabinet and Hideki Tojo Cabinet.

He served from 1942 as the last Imperial Japanese Ambassador to the U.S.S.R. before the Soviet invasion of Manchuria, upon the request of the Minister of Foreign Affairs, Shigenori Tōgō. As Minister, he worked hard to avert war at the Imperial Diet.  one of his missions as Japan's Ambassador to the U.S.S.R. was to seek peace with the Allies through the assistance of the U.S.S.R. due to Soviet–Japanese Neutrality Pact.

However, Satō judged and reported to Tokyo that it was unlikely that the U.S.S.R. would assist Imperial Japan, because it was highly likely that Japan would lose the war, and urged an end the war as early as possible. On August 8, 1945, he was invited to the Kremlin by the U.S.S.R. Foreign Minister, Vyacheslav Molotov, and received the Soviet declaration of war against Imperial Japan. After the war, he was elected to the House of Councillors of the National Diet of Japan in 1947, and served as a President of the House of Councillors from 1949 to 1953.

He died on December 18, 1971, in Tokyo.

References 

1882 births
1971 deaths
Politicians from Osaka Prefecture
Members of the House of Councillors (Japan)
Foreign ministers of Japan
Ambassadors of Japan to the Soviet Union
Hitotsubashi University alumni
Recipients of the Order of the Sacred Treasure, 1st class
Grand Cordons of the Order of the Rising Sun
Recipients of the Order of the Rising Sun with Paulownia Flowers
Ambassadors of Japan to Belgium
Ambassadors of Japan to France
Presidents of the House of Councillors (Japan)